One Big Rush: The Genius of Joe Satriani is a music album by guitarist Joe Satriani, released in 2005. The album contains numerous hits that he has created over the past few decades.

In addition to production and guitar by Joe Satriani, Featured artists include direction by Joel Zimmerman	and cover photography by Jay Blakesberg.

Track listing 
"One Big Rush" - 3:27           
"Surfing with the Alien" - 4:23 
"Sleep Walk" - 2:45             
"Belly Dancer" - 5:02           
"Back to Shalla-Bal" - 3:16     
"(You're) My World" - 3:56      
"Motorcycle Driver" - 4:58      
"All Alone" - 4:22              
"Cryin'" - 5:43                 
"Up In Flames" - 4:33

References

Joe Satriani compilation albums
2005 compilation albums